Lagoa da Fajã de Santo Cristo is a lagoon located on the north coast of the Portuguese island of São Jorge. The lagoon was listed along with Lagoa da Fajã dos Cubres as a "Wetland of International Importance" under the Ramsar Convention in 2005. The fajãs and coastal area connecting the two lagoons make up the remainder of the wetland.

References

Ramsar sites in Portugal
São Jorge Island